Roman Sergeyevich Blagoy (born 25 October 1987) is a Ukrainian professional ice hockey forward.

Blagoy played in the Kontinental Hockey League for HC Donbass and Metallurg Novokuznetsk. He is also a member of the Ukrainian nation team.

References

External links
 

1987 births
Living people
Arlan Kokshetau players
HK Brest players
HC Donbass players
Dunaújvárosi Acélbikák players
Gornyak Rudny players
Kazakhmys Satpaev players
Kompanion Kiev players
Metallurg Novokuznetsk players
HK Mogilev players
Saryarka Karagandy players
Sokil Kyiv players
Ukrainian ice hockey forwards
Ukrainian expatriate sportspeople in Russia
Yermak Angarsk players
Yertis Pavlodar players